De Nijs is a Dutch patronymic surname originating from the given name "Denijs" (=Denis). People with this surname include:

E. Breton de Nijs, pseudonym of Rob Nieuwenhuys (1908–1999), Dutch writer of Indo descent
Jack de Nijs (1941–1997), Dutch musician known by the name "Jack Jersey"
Jan de Nijs (born 1958), Dutch cyclist
Judith de Nijs (born 1942), Dutch swimmer, sister of Lenie
Lenie de Nijs (born 1939), Dutch swimmer, sister of Judith
Rob de Nijs (born 1942), Dutch singer and actor

See also
Denys
Nijs
Nijssen

Dutch-language surnames
Patronymic surnames